Nectamia is a genus of cardinalfishes native to the Indian Ocean and the western and central Pacific Ocean.

Species
The 9 recognized species in this genus are:
 Nectamia annularis (Rüppell, 1829) (ringtail cardinalfish)
 Nectamia bandanensis (Bleeker, 1854) (bigeye cardinalfish)
 Nectamia fusca (Quoy & Gaimard, 1825) (ghost cardinalfish)
 Nectamia ignitops T. H. Fraser, 2008 (fire-eye cardinalfish)
 Nectamia luxuria T. H. Fraser, 2008 (multibarred cardinalfish)
 Nectamia savayensis (Günther, 1872) (Samoan cardinalfish)
 Nectamia similis T. H. Fraser, 2008 (similar cardinalfish)
 Nectamia viria T. H. Fraser, 2008 (bracelet cardinalfish)
 Nectamia zebrinus (T. H. Fraser, J. E. Randall & Lachner, 1999)

References

 
Apogoninae
Marine fish genera
Taxa named by David Starr Jordan